Rajya Sabha elections were held in 1958, to elect members of the Rajya Sabha, Indian Parliament's upper chamber.

Elections
Elections were held in 1958 to elect members from various states.
The list is incomplete.

Members elected
The following members are elected in the elections held in 1958. They are members for the term 1958-64 and retire in year 1964, except in case of the resignation or death before the term.

State - Member - Party

Bye-elections
The following bye elections were held in the year 1958.

State - Member - Party

 Assam - Lila Dhar Barooah  - INC (  ele  27/08/1958 term till 1960 )
 Andhra - B Gopala Reddi - INC (  ele  18/08/1958 term till 1960 )
 Delhi - Ahmed A Mirza - IND ( ele  17/09/1958 term till 1964  )
 Madras - Abdul Rahim - INC ( term till 1962 )
 Rajasthan - Sadiq Ali - INC ( ( ele  04/11/1958 term till 1964 )
 Uttar Pradesh - Dr Dharam Prakash - INC (  ele  09/08/1958 term till 1962 )
 Uttar Pradesh - Hafiz Mohamad Ibrahim - INC (  ele  18/08/1958 term till 1962 )

References

1958 elections in India
1958